Prostanthera carrickiana, commonly known as Carrick's mintbush, is a species of flowering plant in the family Lamiaceae and is endemic to a restricted area in the south-west of Western Australia. It is an erect shrub with hairy branchlets, elliptical leaves pinkish-red flowers.

Description
Flowering occurs from April to May.

Taxonomy
Prostanthera carrickiana was first formally described in 1987 by Barry Conn in the journal Muelleria from specimens collected in the Clyde Hill Nature Reserve. The specific epithet honours the botanist John Carrick.

Distribution and habitat
Carrick's mintbush grows in mallee with a low shrubby understorey but is only known from the Clyde Hill Nature Reserve in the Mallee biogeographic region.

Conservation status
Prostanthera carrickiana is classified as "Priority Four" by the Government of Western Australia Department of Parks and Wildlife, meaning that is rare or near threatened.

References

carrickiana
Flora of Western Australia
Lamiales of Australia
Taxa named by Barry John Conn
Plants described in 1987